Melbourne, the capital of Victoria and the second largest city in Australia, has gained international acclaim for its diverse range of street art and associated subcultures. Throughout the 1970s and 1980s, much of the city's disaffected youth were influenced by the graffiti of New York City, which subsequently became popular in Melbourne's inner suburbs, and along suburban railway and tram lines.

Melbourne was a major city in which stencil art was embraced at an early stage, earning it the title of "stencil capital of the world"; the adoption of stencil art also increased public awareness of the concept of street art. The first stencil festival in the world was held in Melbourne in 2004 and featured the work of many major international artists.

History

Around the turn of the 21st century, forms of street art that began appearing in Melbourne included woodblocking, sticker art, poster art, wheatpasting, graphs, various forms of street installations and reverse graffiti.  A strong sense of community ownership and DIY ethic exists amongst street artists in Melbourne, many of whom act as activists through awareness.

Galleries in the City Centre and inner suburbs now exhibit street art. Prominent Melbourne street artists were featured in Space Invaders, a 2010 exhibition of street art held at the National Gallery of Australia in Canberra. Hosier Lane is Melbourne's most famous laneway for street art, however there are many other laneways in the inner city that exhibit street art.

Prominent international street artists such as Banksy (UK), ABOVE (USA), Fafi (France), D*FACE (UK), Logan Hicks, Revok (USA), Blek le Rat (France), Shepard Fairey (USA) and Invader (France) have contributed work to Melbourne's streets along with visitors from all over the world, most prominently Germany, Canada, the United States, the United Kingdom and New Zealand.

Melbourne's street art scene was explored in the 2005 feature documentary RASH. Official website (archived) RASH on Mutiny Media website

Locations

While there are small areas throughout Greater Melbourne where various forms of street art can be seen, the primary areas in which street art is most densely located include:
 Abbotsford
 Brunswick and East Brunswick
 Carlton and Carlton North
 Collingwood
 Fitzroy and Fitzroy North
 Footscray
 Melbourne City Centre
 Northcote and Westgarth
 Prahran
 Richmond
 South Yarra
 St Kilda

Public and government responses
The proliferation of street art in Melbourne has attracted supporters and detractors from various levels of government and in the broader community. In 2008 a tourism campaign at Florida's Disney World recreated a Melbourne laneway cityscape, decorated with street art. Victorian Premier John Brumby forced the tourism department to withdraw the display, calling graffiti a "blight on the city" and not something "we want to be displaying overseas." Marcus Westbury countered that street art was one of Melbourne's "biggest tourist attractions and one of its most significant cultural movements since the Heidelberg School".

Some street artists and academics have criticized the State Government for having seemingly inconsistent and contradictory views on graffiti. In 2006, the State Government "proudly sponsored" The Melbourne Design Guide, a book which celebrates Melbourne graffiti from a design perspective. That same year, some of Melbourne's graffiti-covered laneways were featured in Tourism Victoria's Lose Yourself in Melbourne campaign. One year later, the State Government introduced tough anti-graffiti laws, with a maximum penalty of two years in prison. Possession of spray cans "without a lawful excuse", either on or around public transport, became illegal, and police search powers were also strengthened. According to Melbourne University criminologist Alison Young, the "state is profiting from the work of artists doing it, but another arm of the state wants to prosecute and possibly imprison (such) people." Since laws were tightened, local councils have reported a "spike" in vandalism and an increase in tagging on commissioned murals and legal street art. Adrian Doyle, founder of the Blender Studios and manager of Melbourne Street Art Tours, believes that people who tag have become less considerate of where they put their tags for fear of being caught by police, and are "paranoid so they are taking less time—tags are less detailed". In 2007, the City of Melbourne started the Do art not tags initiative—an education presentation aimed at teaching primary school students the differences between graffiti and street art.

Some local councils have accepted street art and have even made efforts to preserve it. In early 2008, the Melbourne City Council installed a perspex screen to prevent a 2003 Banksy stencil art piece named Little Diver from being destroyed. In December 2008, silver paint was poured behind the protective screen and tagged with the words: "Banksy woz ere". In April 2010, another stencil by Banksy, also painted in 2003, was destroyed—this time by council workers. The work depicted a parachuting rat and it was believed to be the last surviving Banksy stencil in Melbourne's laneways. Lord Mayor Robert Doyle said: "This was not the Mona Lisa. It is regrettable that we have lost it, but it was an honest mistake by our cleaners in removing tagging graffiti."

The loss of these and other famous street artworks in Melbourne reignited a decade long debate over heritage protection for Melbourne's street art. Planning Minister Justin Madden announced government plans in 2010 involving Heritage Victoria and the National Trust of Australia to assess street art in key locations throughout Melbourne and for culturally significant works to receive recognition for the purpose of preservation. Examples of street art pieces that have been added to the Victorian Heritage Register include: the 1983 mural outside the Aborigines Advancement League building, and a 1984 Keith Haring mural in Collingwood.

The Melbourne City Council acknowledged the difficulties that hinder the preservation of street art, with their graffiti management plan for 2014–18 stating: "Protection of street art is not practical. The only exception may be especially commissioned works".

Events

Empty shows: illegal exhibitions held in derelict buildings since circa 2000
Stencil Festival: The first stencil art festival in the world was held in Melbourne in 2004. It was held annually until 2010.
Street video projection event: video projection events were held in Gertrude Street, Fitzroy in mid-2008.

Melbourne Stencil Festival
The Melbourne Stencil Festival was Australia's premier celebration of international street and stencil art. Since its inauguration in 2004 the festival has become an annual event, touring regional Victoria and other locations within Australia. The festival was held for 10 days each year, involving exhibitions, live demonstrations, artist talks, panel discussions, workshops, master classes and street art related films to the general public. It featured works by emerging and established artists from both Australia and around the world.

Since its inception, the Stencil Festival featured some 800 works by over 150 artists, many of whom were experiencing their first major art exhibition, finding it difficult to be exhibited in major commercial galleries reluctant to display emerging art forms. The first Melbourne Stencil Festival was held in a former sewing factory in North Melbourne in 2004.

2004 – The inaugural festival was held over three days in a warehouse in North Melbourne.
2005 – Featured a ten-day exhibition at the refurbished Meat Market art complex. The festival was supported by the City of Melbourne and saw more than 700 visitors on the opening night.
2006 – The festival moved to Fitzroy, a major location of street art in Melbourne, and was held at the Rose Street Artists Market. For the first time the four-day event was also held in Sydney. It received reviews in major mainstream media in both Melbourne and Sydney.
2007 – Featured a total of 75 artists from 12 countries with more than 300 works. The Melbourne event alone was attended by more than 4,000 visitors with 500 people on the opening night alone. It also attracted a wide range of media coverage including daily newspapers, community radio and street press.
2008 – Toured regionally with the support of Arts Victoria to Ballarat, Sale and Shepparton, and on its own effort interstate to Sydney, Brisbane and Perth.
2009 – The Melbourne Stencil Festival 2009 ran between 25 September and 4 October 2009.
2010 – The Melbourne Stencil Festival transformed in the "Sweet Streets" Festival, an all encompassing festival of street and urban art. It ran between 8 – 24 October 2010.

All Your Walls 
An event in which the entire iconic Hosier lane was repainted by over 150 artists. Produced by Invurt, Just Another Agency and Land of Sunshine in conjunction with the National Gallery of Victoria. It ran between 27 – 29 November 2013.

Notable Melbourne street artists

Dlux – since 2002
Civilian – since 2001
Facter - since 1990
HA-HA
Heesco - since 2010
Jisoe - since 2000
Lushsux – since 2010
Meek – since 2003
Nurock – since 1995
Phibs
Prism – since 2001
Rone – since 2002
Shida – since 2004 
Vexta – 2003
ZAM-1

Other media
RASH (2005) – Feature-length documentary film which explores the cultural value of Melbourne street art and graffiti.
Not Quite Art (2007) – ABC TV series, episode 101 explored Melbourne's street art and DIY culture.

Gallery

See also
Street art
Graffiti
Culture of Melbourne
Lanes and arcades of Melbourne
List of Australian street artists
List of sporting street art in Australia

Other Australian cities:
Newtown area graffiti and street art, Sydney
Street art in Adelaide

Media
Stencil art
Woodblocking
Sticker art
Poster art
Wheatpasting
Street installation

Concepts
Public art
Public space
Community ownership
Reverse graffiti

References

Further reading

External links

Stencil Festival official website
What's On Melbourne - Street Art

Australian art movements
Arts in Melbourne
Graffiti in Australia
Street art in Australia
Public art in Melbourne